Motamed is a surname. Notable people with the surname include:

Fatemeh Motamed-Arya (born 1961), Iranian actress
Fereydoon Motamed (1917–1993), Iranian professor and linguist
Hossein Khan Motamed (1893–1955), Iranian surgeon 
Maurice Motamed (born 1945), Iranian politician
Mohammad Bagheri Motamed (born 1986), Iranian taekwondo practitioner
Nilou Motamed, American magazine editor and television personality
Noreen Motamed (born 1967), Iranian-American artist and painter